Rowland House, also known as the Shovel Shop, is a historic home located at Cheltenham Township, Montgomery County, Pennsylvania. It was built about 1774, expanded about 1810–1820, with additions built in the early 1900s and 1920s / 1930s.  It is a -story, stuccoed stone building with a steep gable roof and one-story, frame addition.

It was added to the National Register of Historic Places in 1979.

References

External links

Houses on the National Register of Historic Places in Pennsylvania
Houses completed in 1774
Houses in Montgomery County, Pennsylvania
Cheltenham Township, Pennsylvania
National Register of Historic Places in Montgomery County, Pennsylvania